Israel–Nigeria relations refers to the bilateral relations between the states of Israel and Nigeria. The Nigerian ambassador to Israel is David Oladipo Obasa. Nigerian government in collaboration with the Israeli government to bring Science, technology and innovation (STI) to the teeming youths of Nigeria in other to reduce the rate of unemployment amongst youth in Nigeria.

History

Israel and Nigeria established diplomatic relations in 1960.

During the Nigerian Civil War, although both sides acquired weapons from Israel, Israel lent assistance to Biafran rebels in addition to providing humanitarian assistance to Biafra.

During the 1960s and early 1970s, Israel played a significant role in the development of Sub-Saharan Africa, including Nigeria. Hundreds of Israeli experts and volunteers were sent to help in the development and modernization of agriculture, education, medicine and technology training. Israeli Moshe "Jerry" Beit Halevi was Nigeria's first football coach following independence. His spell reflected the close ties between Nigeria's Southern and the Western regions with Israel, alongside the tensions between Nigeria's Northern region with Israel. The coverage of his games in the press reflected the deep divisions that plagued Nigeria during the first republic. At the same time, hundreds of Nigerian farmers, experts, educators, academicians, students, doctors, community workers and engineers were trained in Israel.

After the Yom Kippur War in 1973, Nigeria severed diplomatic ties with Israel. Diplomatic relations were restored in September 1992.

Since April 1993, Israel has maintained an embassy in Abuja and Nigeria has an embassy in Tel Aviv. Over fifty Israeli companies operate in Nigeria in the spheres of construction, infrastructure, hi-tech, communications and IT, agriculture and water management. In turn, there are over 5,000 Nigerian companies and organizations that operate in Israel. Trade and commerce are promoted by the Israeli Export and International Cooperation Institute, the Nigerian-Israeli Chamber of Commerce (NICC) and the Israel-Africa Chamber of Commerce.

In 2006, a Nigerian-Israeli Business Forum was inaugurated in Abuja. That year, the Ministries of Foreign Affairs of both countries signed a Memorandum of Understanding (MOU) in which Israel and Nigeria agreed to consult on issues of bilateral relations and other regional and international issues of mutual interest. The first round of consultations took place in Jerusalem in November 2006.

In 2013, President Goodluck Jonathan became the first Nigerian President to visit the State of Israel. He had gone on a pilgrimage and signed bilateral air service agreements with Prime Minister Benjamin Netanyahu.

According to the Nigerian ambassador to Israel, Solel Boneh, an Israeli construction company, is a household word in parts of Nigeria.

In June 2014 during the kidnapping of Israeli teens, before they were found murdered, Nigeria's President Goodluck Jonathan wrote to Israel's Netanyahu: "... I assure you that we are in solidarity with you, as we believe that any act of terrorism against any nation or group is an act against our common humanity. We unequivocally condemn this dastardly act, and demand that the children are released unconditionally by their abductors."

See also
History of the Jews in Nigeria
International recognition of Israel

References

External links
 Israeli embassy in Abuja
 Nigerian embassy in Tel Aviv

 

 
Nigeria
Bilateral relations of Nigeria